The 2017–18 Minnesota Wild season was the 18th season for the National Hockey League franchise that was established on June 25, 1997.

Standings

Schedule and results

Preseason
The team's preseason schedule was released on June 13, 2017.

Regular season
The regular season schedule was published on June 22, 2017.

Playoffs

Player statistics
As of April 21, 2018
Skaters

Goaltenders

Awards and honours

Awards

Milestones

Transactions
The Wild have been involved in the following transactions during the 2017–18 season.

Trades

Notes
 The Vegas Golden Knights will select Erik Haula in the 2017 NHL Expansion Draft

Free agents acquired

Free agents lost

Claimed via waivers

Lost via waivers

Lost via retirement

Player signings

Draft picks

Below are the Minnesota Wild's selections at the 2017 NHL Entry Draft, which was held on June 23 and 24, 2017 at the United Center in Chicago.

Draft notes:
 The Arizona Coyotes' fourth-round pick went to the Minnesota Wild as the result of a trade on February 26, 2017 that sent Grayson Downing, a first-round pick in 2017, a second-round pick in 2018 and a conditional fourth-round pick in 2019 to Arizona in exchange for Martin Hanzal, Ryan White and this pick.

References

Minnesota Wild seasons
Minnesota Wild
Minnesota Wild
Minnesota Wild